The enzyme aminocarboxymuconate-semialdehyde decarboxylase catalyzes the chemical reaction

2-amino-3-(3-oxoprop-1-en-1-yl)but-2-enedioate  2-aminomuconate semialdehyde + CO2

This enzyme belongs to the family of lyases, specifically the carboxy-lyases, which cleave carbon-carbon bonds.  This enzyme participates in tryptophan metabolism. It has been identified as a marker in nonverbal autism.

Nomenclature 

The systematic name of this enzyme class is 2-amino-3-(3-oxoprop-1-en-1-yl)but-2-enedioate carboxy-lyase (2-aminomuconate-semialdehyde-forming). Other names in common use include picolinic acid carboxylase, picolinic acid decarboxylase, alpha-amino-beta-carboxymuconate-epsilon-semialdehade decarboxylase, alpha-amino-beta-carboxymuconate-epsilon-semialdehyde, beta-decarboxylase, 2-amino-3-(3-oxoprop-2-enyl)but-2-enedioate carboxy-lyase, and 2-amino-3-(3-oxoprop-1-en-1-yl)but-2-enedioate carboxy-lyase.

References

Further reading 

EC 4.1.1
Enzymes of known structure